Pit Stop is a 1969 film directed by Jack Hill and starring Brian Donlevy and Richard Davalos. It was the final film for Hollywood veteran Brian Donlevy.

Plot
Rick, a brash, hustling, opportunistic amateur drag racer, is courted by affluent Grant Willard, who wants him to participate in his burgeoning Figure 8 stock car racing competitions, where the driving pattern guarantees crashes and injuries. Rick quickly starts trying to undermine a popular star of Willard's races, Hawk Sidney, who is prone to over-the-top boasting and taunts. Rick succeeds in defeating him, and wooing away Jolene, a groupie he had been keeping time with. Initially, Hawk reacts violently, destroying Rick's car after a race and beating him up. However, the two men ultimately come to a respectful truce. Rick then sets his sights on besting the comparably calm and conservative champion Ed McCleod, whose wife Ellen frequently helps with the upkeep of his car, but is clearly feeling neglected. Willard encourages Rick's ambitious desire to win, even though it endangers Hawk and Ed. Rick proposes a big challenge to a driver from a rival organization, initially suggesting it as a showcase for all of his drivers, and at a beach party before the race, Rick and Ellen share intimacy. On the day of the race, Willard states that as long as his team wins, it doesn't matter whether the win is taken by Rick or Ed, tacitly approving him showing up the veteran. Hawk is quickly eliminated, and Ed has a crash that he initially walks away from, setting the stage for Rick to win. However, no one from the team is present to congratulate Rick, as they have gone to the hospital where Ed has been taken. When Rick arrives there, he learns that by walking to the ambulance under his own power, instead of allowing paramedics to handle him, lingering whiplash from the wreck broke Ed's neck, and he has died. Willard proposes Rick take Ed's place in an upcoming high-profile race, and Rick accepts, even though he sees that Hawk, Ellen, and Jolene have now lost respect for him.

Cast
Brian Donlevy as Grant Willard
Richard Davalos (billed as Dick Davalos) as Rick Bowman
Ellen Burstyn (billed as Ellen McRae) as Ellen McLeod
George Washburn as Ed McLeod
Sid Haig as Hawk Sidney
Beverly Washburn as Jolene

Production
The original title was The Winner but it had to be retitled when Winning was released. It was retitled Pit Stop even though there is no pit stop in the film. Jack Hill saw figure 8 racing and he thought it was so "crazy and so loony" he wanted to document it. The film has come to be regarded as one of Hill's best, even though the fact it was shot in black and white hurt its commercial success. It has earned a cult following. The opening credits indicate that the movie was filmed in 1967.

Although the soundtrack is credited to Seattle psychedelic band The Daily Flash, the group had already disbanded before the film's production. It should actually be credited to the post-Daily Flash project Two Guitars, Piano, Drum & Darryl.

References

External links

1969 films
Films directed by Jack Hill
American auto racing films
1960s English-language films
1960s American films